Dom Guido Grandi, O.S.B. Cam. (1 October 1671 – 4 July 1742) was an Italian monk, priest, philosopher, theologian, mathematician, and engineer.

Life
Grandi was born on 1 October 1671 in Cremona, Italy and christened Luigi Francesco Lodovico. When he was of age, he was educated at the Jesuit college there. After he completed his studies there in 1687, he entered the novitiate of the Camaldolese monks at Ferrara and took the name of Guido. In 1693 he was sent to the Monastery of St. Gregory the Great, the Camaldolese house in Rome, to complete his studies in philosophy and  theology in preparation for Holy Orders. A year later, Grandi was assigned as professor of both fields at the Camaldolese Monastery of St. Mary of the Angels in Florence. It appears that it was during this period of his life that he took an interest in mathematics. He did his research privately, however, as he was appointed professor of philosophy at St. Gregory Monastery in 1700, subsequently holding a post in the same field in Pisa, where he replaced Pascasio Giannetti.

By 1707, however, Dom Grandi had developed such a reputation in the field of mathematics that he was named court mathematician to the Grand Duke of Tuscany, Cosimo III de Medici. In that post, he also worked as an engineer, being appointed Superintendent of Water for the Duchy, and in that capacity he was involved in the drainage of the Chiana Valley. In 1709 he visited England where he clearly impressed his colleagues there, as he was elected a Fellow of the Royal Society. The University of Pisa named him Professor of Mathematics in 1714. It was there that he died on 4 July 1742.

Mathematical studies
This curve was later studied by one of the few women scientists to achieve a degree, Maria Gaetana Agnesi. Through a mistranslation by the translator of her work into English who mistook the term "witch" for Grandi's term, this curve became known in English as the witch of Agnesi. It was through his studies on this curve that Grandi helped introduce Leibniz' ideas on calculus to Italy.

In mathematics Grandi is best known for his work Flores geometrici (1728), studying the rose curve, a curve which has the shape of a petalled flower, and for Grandi's series. He named the rose curve rhodonea. He also contributed to the Note on the Treatise of Galileo Concerning Natural Motion in the first Florentine edition of Galileo Galilei's works.

List of works

See also
Tommaso Perelli

References

External links

Galileo Project: Guido Grandi

Engineers from Florence
Italian philosophers
17th-century Italian mathematicians
18th-century Italian mathematicians
Camaldolese Order
Fellows of the Royal Society
Catholic clergy scientists
1671 births
1742 deaths
Italian Benedictines
Benedictine scholars
Clergy from Cremona
Benedictine writers
Grandi's series
Scientists from Cremona